The Wisconsin Badgers college football team competes as part of the NCAA Division I Football Bowl Subdivision (FBS), representing the University of Wisconsin–Madison in the West Division of the Big Ten Conference.

Since the establishment of the team in 1889, Wisconsin has appeared in 34 bowl games. Included in these games are ten appearances in the Rose Bowl Game with only three victories, five Bowl Championship Series (BCS) game appearances, and three New Years Six Bowls in the Cotton Bowl, Rose Bowl and Orange Bowl. They have appeared in bowl games 26 of the last 28 seasons, including a current streak of 21 consecutive bowl appearances.  Through the history of the program, seven separate coaches have led the Badgers to bowl games, with Barry Alvarez having the most appearances at thirteen.

Bowl games

Bowl opponent frequency

Notes

References
General

Specific

Wisconsin Badgers

Wisconsin Badgers bowl games